MS Queen Elizabeth (QE) is a cruise ship of the  operated by the Cunard Line. This is due to a more vertical stern, and additional cabins for single travelers. The bow of Queen Elizabeth and Queen Victoria are both reinforced having thicker than the standard for hull plating, to handle North Atlantic weather. The ship is able to carry up to 2,092 passengers.

The ship's name was announced by Cunard on 10 October 2007. The naming of the ship as Queen Elizabeth brings about a situation similar to that between 1940 and 1948, when Cunard's original Queen Elizabeth was in service at the same time as the Royal Navy battleship .

Design

Exterior
Queen Elizabeth is almost identical in design to Queen Victoria, although because of the steeper stern, at her introduction into service the passenger capacity was slightly higher with up to 2,058 compared to Queen Victorias 2,014.

Also unlike many previous Cunard Queens, Queen Elizabeth is not a true ocean liner as she does not have the heavy plating throughout the hull. However, the bow was constructed with heavier plating to cope with the transatlantic run, and the ship has a high freeboard.

Interior
Although having an almost identical interior arrangement to Queen Victoria, the decor is very different. The ship is a tribute to the two previous Queen Elizabeth-named ships: the original  and Queen Elizabeth 2. She also evokes the era of the 1930s, in which Cunard's first Queen Elizabeth was launched, with many art deco interior touches. This service allows passengers in the Britannia staterooms to have single seating dining arrangements, without having to upgrade to the more expensive Grills classes. The sliding roof over the Winter Garden featured on Queen Victoria is replaced with a simple glass roof with the space being renamed The Garden Lounge.

Launch
Following the ship's construction in Italy from 2007 to 2010, Cunard Line officially confirmed that Queen Elizabeth II would name Cunard's new ship. The ceremony was held in Southampton on 11 October 2010 before the ship set sail on her maiden voyage to the Canary Islands the following day. Queen Elizabeth II was also the sponsor of the now-retired Queen Elizabeth 2 in 1967 and Cunard's current flagship, Queen Mary 2, in 2004.

Service history
The first master of Queen Elizabeth was Captain Christopher Wells. On 4 October 2010 Queen Elizabeth was formally handed over to Cunard. She sailed on her maiden voyage from Southampton on 12 October 2010, following a naming ceremony with the monarch on 11 October 2010.

On 13 January 2011, two years after the first Cunard Royal Rendezvous, RMS Queen Mary 2 met up with Queen Victoria and the then brand new Queen Elizabeth for another Royal Rendezvous in New York City. Both Queen Victoria and Queen Elizabeth made an Atlantic crossing in tandem for the event. All three Cunarders met in front of the Statue of Liberty at 6:45 pm for a Grucci fireworks display. The Empire State Building was lit up in red to mark the event. At the end of October 2011 Queen Elizabeth and her fleet mates were registered to Hamilton, Bermuda, in order to host weddings aboard.

On 5 June 2012 all three 'Queens' met once more, but this time in Southampton in order to celebrate the Queen's Diamond Jubilee. On 29 June 2012, the ship made her one and only visit to Ny-Ålesund, in Svalbard. The previous scheduled visit in 2011 had to be aborted due to bad weather. However, she was not scheduled to visit Svalbard in her 2013 schedule. Legislation relating to cruise ships visiting the archipelago (applicable from 2014) meant that Queen Elizabeth will never be able to visit again. On 15 July 2012 both Queen Elizabeth and Queen Mary 2 visited Hamburg for the first time together.

On 12 March 2013 the cruise ship passed the former Cunard liner , then a hotel in Long Beach, California, for the first time along with fireworks display. On 31 August 2013, British journalist and broadcaster Sir David Frost had been invited to give a speech by Cunard whilst travelling on board the ship but died of a heart attack.

On 9 May 2014 both Queen Elizabeth and Queen Victoria led in single file, Queen Mary 2 up the Southampton channel, with both ships docking in a bow to bow formation performing a birthday salute to Queen Mary 2. Later on, all three Cunarders gathered for a fireworks display during which Queen Mary 2 led both Queen Elizabeth and Queen Victoria back down the channel.

On 25 May 2015 the three 'Queens' were positioned at Liverpool celebrating 175 years of the formation of the Cunard Line, which was formed and based in the city. At low tide, the three ships stopped in line in middle of the River Mersey, bow to stern, turned 180 degrees in full synchronisation with each other, which was known as river dance), they then formed an arrow side by side. Queen Mary 2 was in the centre with its bow in line with the Cunard Building at the Pier Head. The Royal Air Force's display team, the Red Arrows, performed a flypast in Vic formation, emitting red, white and blue smoke, over the vessels. An estimated 1.3 million people lined the river banks to witness the spectacle.

On 13 August 2016 Queen Elizabeth made the 2,500th cruise ship call at Kiel, Germany.

On 23 May 2019, Queen Elizabeth began regular service between Vancouver, British Columbia, Canada and various destinations in Alaska, United States.

Australia 2019 
Queen Elizabeth left Southampton in December 2019 for an extended cruise season in Australia. 

On 24 February 2020 Queen Elizabeth was denied permission to dock in Rabaul by the  Governor of East New Britain Province, Papua New Guinea due to their growing concerns regarding the COVID-19 pandemic.

Australia banned cruise ships arriving from foreign ports from 15 March 2020, and on 27 March 2020 directed all foreign-flagged ships to leave the country. Queen Elizabeth was initially moored offshore near Newcastle, Australia, before departing for Manila Bay, Philippines, to anchor with a number of other cruise ships.   

On 26 July 2020 Queen Elizabeth departed Manila Bay and returned to the UK where it moored with its sister ship, Queen Mary 2 and Queen Victoria, off the Dorset coast for the rest of 2020 and the first half of 2021.

Resumption of cruising 2021 

Resumption of cruising by Queen Elizabeth, scheduled for 19 July 2021, was delayed due to a small number of crew contracting COVID-19.  

Queen Elizabeth finally returned to sailing on 13 August 2021 after a 17-month break.

Australia 2022 
Queen Elizabeth returned to Australia for an extended cruise season on 7 November 2022.

On 27 November 2022 Queen Elizabeth was prevented from visiting Bali, Indonesia, due to some passengers testing positive for COVID-19 and was diverted to Fremantle but was then able to continue the scheduled cruise around Australian.

In January 2023, the Queen Elizabeth was forced to skip visits to Fiordland, including Milford Sound, and Dunedin in New Zealand due to biofouling concerns. In February 2023, after extensive consultation with New Zealand authorities, it was stipulated that additional work was required in advance of visiting any New Zealand destinations, which was not possible.  The planned cruise to New Zealand was replaced with visits to Australian ports.

Special voyages

QE2 50th Anniversary Celebration
In September 2017 the ship hosted a special commemorative cruise to honour the 50th anniversary of its predecessor QE2. The Mediterranean cruise was chosen to pay tribute to QE2's role as a cruise ship. Special guests include Captain Ian McNaught, Commodore Ronald Warwick, Maritime Historian Chris Frame and QE2 Social Hostess Maureen Ryan.

References

Notes

Bibliography

External links

 MS Queen Elizabeth on Cunard.co.uk
 

2010 ships
Ships of the Cunard Line
Panamax cruise ships
Ships built in Monfalcone
Ships built by Fincantieri
Passenger ships of Bermuda
2010 establishments in England